James Stephen Baulch (born 3 May 1973) is a retired Welsh sprint athlete and television presenter. He won the 400 metres gold medal at the 1999 World Indoor Championships. As a member of British 4 × 400 metres relay teams, he won a gold medal at the 1997 World Championships, and silver medal at the 1996 Olympic Games. He represented Wales at the Commonwealth Games where he won an individual silver and a bronze medal in the 4 × 400 m relay.

Athletics career

Early career
Baulch made his debut for the GB & NI team at a Junior International in Salamanca, Spain, in 1991, winning the 200m and breaking the Welsh record in that race. Baulch then changed his distance preference becoming a 400 metres specialist. Baulch particularly excelled at running the distance indoors (where races are usually run on 200m tracks rather than outdoor tracks which are 400m long). He won the 400m gold medal at the World Indoor Championships in 1999, and also claimed silver and bronze medals at the event in 1997 and 2003.

In 1993 Baulch ran a Welsh record 46.50 at Sheffield in his first individual race at the distance since 1990, and he made a breakthrough in 1995 when he progressed to 45.14.

1996-99
In 1996 Baulch ran a 44.19 second leg for Britain's Olympic silver medal team that set a European record, and set his fifth Welsh record with 44.57.

Baulch was a member of the British 4 × 400 m relay team which finished second in the 1997 World Championships. However, on 7 January 2010, it was announced the British team were to be awarded the gold medal as they were beaten by a United States team which included Antonio Pettigrew, who subsequently admitted to having taken performance-enhancing drugs, thus disqualifying the US team. Baulch received his World Championship gold medal in May 2010 and, although he was happy, he said: "It would have been great to have been in front of 80,000 people up on the rostrum...nothing can replace that. This is a second best unfortunately, but it's nice to be recognised".

In 1997 he set Welsh indoor records at 46.36 and 46.13 before breaking Todd Bennett's 12-year-old UK and Commonwealth indoor record of 45.56 with 45.39 at the UK Trials and then took the World Indoor silver behind Sunday Bada (Nigeria). Later he made the World final outdoors with a season's best 44.69 in the semis and ran a 44.08 third leg on the British silver-medal relay team.

In 1999 he won all of his five competitions at 400m, including taking the gold medal at the World Indoor Championships in Maebashi, Japan and running a best time of 45.60 in Birmingham.

Outdoors he had a best of 44.82 in Lausanne, which he followed with a clear win at the AAAs in 45.36. At the World Championships he had four individual runs in the low-45s, again making the final, and ran a 44.24 anchor leg for the British team that went out in the heats of the 4 × 400 m.

2000-03
In 2000 Baulch won over 400m at the European Cup and had a season's best of 45.06, but had a disappointing Olympic Games, going out in the heats of the 400m in 46.52, although producing a final leg of 44.65 to ensure that Britain made the final of the relay.

Baulch was selected as captain of the British team at the 2001 World Indoors, but had to withdraw through injury and struggled for form in the summer, with a season's best of 46.15 in the heats at Edmonton, where he ran an encouraging 44.4 second leg for the British team in the final of the World 4 × 400 m. With an individual best of 46.01, he was again seen to best effect in relays in 2002, with a third leg of 45.1 to help Britain to victory in the European Cup 4 × 400 m and a third leg of 44.5 for the Welsh team that took the silver medal at the Commonwealth Games in a race against England.

He came back to form in 2003 with two bronze medals at the World Indoors, when he ran 45.99 to share the individual bronze medal with Paul McKee and in the relay. He ran a solid third leg for the British 4 × 400 m team at the European Cup, but had a disappointing outdoor season with a best of 46.43.

Change of coach 
Baulch left coach Linford Christie in a bid to revive his athletics career, moving to Atlanta with new trainer Innocent Egbunike of Nigeria, a 4 × 400 m bronze medallist at the 1984 Olympics and a silver medallist in the individual 400m at the world championships in 1987.

Media career 
In 1999 and 2000, Baulch hosted the British children's series Energize! He has also appeared on A Question of Sport, and finished third in the BBC programme Superstars in 2003. He was a trainee ranger in Safari School, broadcast in January–February 2007, and competed in Celebrity Mastermind in 2014. His specialist subject was the musician, Prince. Baulch became part of a circus act on Cirque de celebrite.

An Olympic special of Dancing on Ice aired in July 2012, before the London 2012 Summer Olympics. It featured medal-winning Olympic athletes, including Baulch.

Post-Athletics and business ventures 
After his retirement from athletics in 2005 Baulch set up several different businesses including Definitive, a sports management company and sports memorabilia company Authentic Sports. 
Baulch also launched fundraising platform uWin, and silent auction hosting company, BidAid.

Baulch is part-owner of fashion brand Crow & Jester.
Baulch is also known to be actively involved with Jaguar Cars. From 2009- 2015 Jamie was an Ambassador for the Jaguar Academy of Sport, playing a key role in mentoring the next generation of British sporting talent.

Jamie heads up The "21 Day ShapeUp by the Family" online challenge.

Baulch also became a squad member for the Welsh touch rugby team in 2010 which won the European cup later that year.

Charity work 

 Jamie Baulch has been involved with a local charity called Ty Hafan a children's hospice
 Baulch also competed in race against a racehorse raising money for Barnardos
 Baulch also ran in the London Marathon in 2011 raising money for Barnardos

Trampolining 
Baulch excelled as a trampolinist in his youth, and won a silver medal at the Welsh Schools Trampoline Championship in 1991.

Family and personal life 
Baulch was born in Nottingham, but raised by adoptive parents in Risca, near Newport, Wales. Baulch is mixed race, his biological parents being a white English mother and a black Jamaican father. In 2014 Baulch made a TV documentary for the BBC, Being Jamie Baulch: Looking for My Birth Mum, where he tracked down and was reunited with his birth mother. He then made a follow-up documentary for the BBC, Being Jamie Baulch: The Search for My Birth Dad, in 2016.

Achievements

Personal outdoor bests

Personal indoor bests

Medals

References

External links 
 
 
 
 

1973 births
Living people
Welsh male sprinters
British male sprinters
Sportspeople from Nottingham
People from Risca
Sportspeople from Caerphilly County Borough
Sportspeople from Newport, Wales
Athletes (track and field) at the 1996 Summer Olympics
Athletes (track and field) at the 2000 Summer Olympics
Olympic silver medallists for Great Britain
Olympic athletes of Great Britain
Welsh Olympic medallists
Commonwealth Games silver medallists for Wales
Commonwealth Games bronze medallists for Wales
Commonwealth Games medallists in athletics
Athletes (track and field) at the 1994 Commonwealth Games
Athletes (track and field) at the 1998 Commonwealth Games
Athletes (track and field) at the 2002 Commonwealth Games
World Athletics Championships medalists
European Athletics Championships medalists
Black British sportsmen
Welsh people of Jamaican descent
British sportspeople of Jamaican descent
Medalists at the 1996 Summer Olympics
Olympic silver medalists in athletics (track and field)
World Athletics Indoor Championships winners
World Athletics Indoor Championships medalists
World Athletics Championships winners
Medallists at the 1998 Commonwealth Games
Medallists at the 2002 Commonwealth Games